Cibola County is a county in the U.S. state of New Mexico. As of the 2010 census, the population was 27,213. Its county seat is Grants. It is New Mexico's youngest county, and the third youngest county in the United States, created on June 19, 1981, from the westernmost four-fifths of the formerly much larger Valencia County.

Cibola County comprises the Grants, New Mexico Micropolitan Statistical Area. The county is a rich mining area with numerous Uranium mines.

Geography

Adjacent counties
 McKinley County - north
 Sandoval County - northeast
 Bernalillo County - east
 Valencia County - east
 Socorro County - southeast
 Catron County - south
 Apache County, Arizona - west

National protected areas
 Cibola National Forest (part)
 El Malpais National Conservation Area
 El Malpais National Monument
 El Morro National Monument

Demographics

2000 census
As of the 2000 census, there were 25,595 people, 8,327 households, and 6,278 families living in the county. The population density was 6 people per square mile (2/km2). There were 10,328 housing units at an average density of 2 per square mile (1/km2). The racial makeup of the county was 39.61% White, 0.96% Black or African American, 40.32% Native American, 0.38% Asian, 0.05% Pacific Islander, 15.44% from other races, and 3.24% from two or more races. 33.42% of the population were Hispanic or Latino of any race.

There were 8,327 households, out of which 38.00% had children under the age of 18 living with them, 50.60% were married couples living together, 18.30% had a female householder with no husband present, and 24.60% were non-families. 21.10% of all households were made up of individuals, and 7.30% had someone living alone who was 65 years of age or older. The average household size was 2.95 and the average family size was 3.41.

In the county, the population was spread out, with 30.70% under the age of 18, 9.60% from 18 to 24, 27.50% from 25 to 44, 21.50% from 45 to 64, and 10.70% who were 65 years of age or older. The median age was 33 years. For every 100 females there were 95.50 males. For every 100 females age 18 and over, there were 92.20 males.

The median income for a household in the county was $27,774, and the median income for a family was $30,714. Males had a median income of $27,652 versus $20,078 for females. The per capita income for the county was $11,731. About 21.50% of families and 24.80% of the population were below the poverty line, including 32.00% of those under age 18 and 17.70% of those age 65 or over.

2010 census
As of the 2010 census, there were 27,213 people, 8,860 households, and 6,274 families living in the county. The racial makeup of the county was 41.8% white, 41.0% American Indian, 1.0% black or African American, 0.5% Asian, 0.1% Pacific islander, 12.4% from other races, and 3.1% from two or more races. Those of Hispanic or Latino origin made up 36.5% of the population. In terms of ancestry, 5.4% were Irish, and 1.5% were American.

Of the 8,860 households, 38.0% had children under the age of 18 living with them, 41.1% were married couples living together, 20.8% had a female householder with no husband present, 29.2% were non-families, and 24.9% of all households were made up of individuals. The average household size was 2.79 and the average family size was 3.30. The median age was 36.6 years.

The median income for a household in the county was $37,361 and the median income for a family was $41,187. Males had a median income of $36,027 versus $25,318 for females. The per capita income for the county was $14,712. About 20.1% of families and 24.0% of the population were below the poverty line, including 32.7% of those under age 18 and 14.3% of those age 65 or over.

Education

School districts serving portions of the county include:
 Grants-Cibola County Schools
 Quemado Independent Schools
 Zuni Public Schools

All public schools in the county are operated by Grants/Cibola County Schools; the Quemado and Zuni facilities are in other counties.

Due to an agreement between Cibola County and McKinley County, residents of the Ramah Navajo Indian Reservation are bussed to schools in Ramah in McKinley County (including Ramah Middle/High School) even though they are physically in Cibola County, due to the long distance to the nearest Cibola County schools from the reservation.

Corrections
Cibola County is home to three prisons:
 the Cibola County Correctional Center, operated by Corrections Corporation of America, housing 1129 federal inmates under a contract with the Federal Bureau of Prisons and the United States Marshal Service
 the New Mexico Women's Correctional Facility, run by CCA for the state of New Mexico, and
 Western New Mexico Correctional Facility, owned and operated by the state, with about 440 male inmates

In November 2018, following a private autopsy, a unit of the Cibola County Correctional Center (CCCC) was named in the abuse and wrongful death on May 25, 2018, of Roxsana Hernández Rodríguez. Rodríguez was a 33yo transgender immigrant from Honduras. The CCCC is operated under contract by CoreCivic.

Politics

Cibola County tends to support the Democratic Party. Only once in its history (1984) has it voted for a Republican presidential nominee, when Ronald Reagan won the county in his 49-state landslide.

At the state level, the only time it has voted for a Republican nominee for Governor was 2014, when Susana Martinez carried all but five counties in her reelection bid.

Communities

City
 Grants (county seat)

Village
 Milan

Census-designated places 
There are 32 Census Designated Places contained within the county, largely designated in 1980.

 Acomita Lake
 Anzac Village
 Bibo
 Bluewater Village
 Broadview
 Candy Kitchen
 Cubero
 El Morro Valley
 Encinal
 Fence Lake
 Golden Acres
 Laguna
 Las Tusas
 Lobo Canyon
 McCartys Village
 Mesita
 Moquino
 Mount Taylor
 Mountain View
 North Acomita Village
 Paguate
 Paraje
 Pinehill
 San Fidel
 San Mateo
 San Rafael
 Seama
 Seboyeta
 Skyline-Ganipa
 South Acomita Village
 Stoneridge
 Timberlake (part)

Unincorporated communities 

 Alaska
 Casa Blanca
 Cebolleta
 Cebolletita
 Cubero
 El Rito
 Fence Lake
 New Laguna

Ghost towns 
 Anaconda

See also
 National Register of Historic Places listings in Cibola County, New Mexico

References
Specific

General
 County status and boundary changes United States Census Bureau

Further reading
 Baldwin, J.A. and D.R. Rankin. (1995). Hydrogeology of Cibola County, New Mexico [Water-Resources Investigations Report 94-4178]. Albuquerque: U.S. Department of the Interior, U.S. Geological Survey.
 Maxwell, C.H. (1989). Mineral resources of the Petaca Pinta wilderness study area, Cibola County, New Mexico [U.S. Geological Survey Bulletin 1734-H]. Denver: U.S. Department of the Interior, U.S. Geological Survey.

External links

 
1981 establishments in New Mexico
Populated places established in 1981